La Tetilla is a corregimiento in Calobre District, Veraguas Province, Panama with a population of 400 as of 2010. Its population as of 1990 was 419; its population as of 2000 was 387.

References

Corregimientos of Veraguas Province